Emmanuel Fillion (born October 28, 1966) is a French-American sculptor. He was born in Soissons, France in 1966. He started sculpting at the age of 15 as an apprentice renovating historical monuments in France. His marble and bronze works can be seen in public places, private homes and private collections including the Spencer and Marlene Hays collection. He has a studio in the Pietrasanta, Italy, and one in Malibu, and was the subject of a documentary by Gina Minervini called "Through the Eyes of the Sculptor." 

Emmanuel Fillion's work is inspired by dance and movement as seen in the homage to Martha Graham sculpture in the Wallis Center for the Performing Arts in Los Angeles. He portrays the fine line between nature and the nude with nod to Japanese culture, the art of Shibari and the technique of Shou Sugi Ban or Yakisugi. 

In one of Fillion's later works, he has also portrayed Black women using Belgian black marble to sculpt a figure titled "African Queen". Fillion's sculptures "After the Fire" and "Tronc Brule" ("Burnt Trunk" in French) are part of a collection of work titled "Introspective." These sculptures were created after a series of personal and environmental issues inspired the artist to reflect on the power of rebirth. In the center of "Tronc Brule", an coating of gold leaf reminds the viewer to see beauty in the cycle of life, and in "After the Fire", the bronze branch stands out from the black marble to remind of the viewer rebirth follows destruction. His artwork is a relevant beacon during this time of environmental crises and yet it is timeless in its message of hope, according to Malibu Times Magazine.

In 2018, Malibu was ravaged by the Woolsey fire. More than 100,000 acres were burned, residents lost their homes and some were killed. Fillion was deeply affected by this tragedy because he lives in Malibu and has friends there. In Californian, the subject of fire is omnipresent. Fillion sees fear and hope as a necessary part of life. 

Fillion is a descendant of Jean Cousin (1500 – before 1593), who was a French painter, sculptor, etcher, engraver, and geometrician known for his famous painting in the Louvre of Eva Prima Pandora, 1550.

References

https://mixp.issuu.com/bhcourier/docs/bhc010314/20

External links 
 Official website

1966 births
Living people
French sculptors
American sculptors